Richard Michell Upjohn, FAIA, (March 7, 1828 – March 3, 1903) was an American architect, co-founder and president of the American Institute of Architects.

Early life and career
Upjohn was born on March 7, 1828, in Shaftesbury, Dorsetshire, England and his family emigrated to the United States in 1829. He was the son of the famous architect Richard Upjohn (1802–1878) and Elizabeth (née Parry) Upjohn (1803–1882).

In 1853 at eighteen years old, he joined his father's New York architectural firm to study architecture and later became his father's partner. The earliest building that architectural scholars credit to him alone is Madison Square Presbyterian Church in New York City, built from 1853 to 1854.  He became best known, much like his father, for his High Gothic Revival style of architecture.  He, again like his father, was a founding member and president of the American Institute of Architects.

A number of noteworthy architects trained in his office, including Clarence Fagan True.  A number of buildings that he designed are now listed on the National Register of Historic Places (NRHP).  Four are listed as National Historic Landmarks.

Personal life
On October 1, 1856, Upjohn was married to Emma Degen Tyng (1836–1906).  Together, they were the parents of three daughters and five sons, including Hobart Upjohn, who practiced as a civil engineer and architect.

Upjohn died on March 3, 1903, at his home, 296 Clinton Street, in Brooklyn, New York.  He was buried in Green-Wood Cemetery, for which he and his father had done design work many years before.

Works with Richard Upjohn
St. John Chrysostom Church (1851) in Delafield, Wisconsin, on the NRHP
St. Peter's Episcopal Church (1859) in Albany, New York, a National Historic Landmark
Trinity-St. Paul's Episcopal Church (1862–63) in New Rochelle, New York, on the NRHP
All Saint's Memorial Church (1864) in Navesink, New Jersey, a National Historic Landmark
The third Saint Thomas Church (1865–70) in New York City, destroyed by fire in 1905
Green-Wood Cemetery (1860s) in Brooklyn, New York, a National Historic Landmark
Edwin A. Stevens Hall (1871) in Hoboken, New Jersey, on the NRHP
St. Paul's Episcopal Church (1871–75) in Selma, Alabama, on the NRHP

Works as Richard M. Upjohn
Individual projects include:
Madison Square Presbyterian Church (1853–54), at Madison Avenue and 24th Street, New York City, demolished for Stanford White's Madison Square Presbyterian Church (1906)
St. James Episcopal Church (1855) in La Grange, Texas, on the NRHP
St. Luke's Church (1857) in Clermont, New York, on the NRHP
Christ Church Episcopal (1866) in Riverdale, New York, on the NRHP
St. Alban's Episcopal Church (1865) in Staten Island, New York, on the NRHP
Church of the Covenant (1865–67) in Boston, Massachusetts
St. Paul's Church (1866) in Brooklyn, New York, on the NRHP
St. John's Protestant Episcopal Church (1869) in Stamford, Connecticut, on the NRHP
Trinity Church (1871) in Thomaston, Connecticut, on the NRHP
First National Bank (1871) in Salt Lake City, Utah, on the NRHP
Connecticut State Capitol (1871-1878) in Hartford, Connecticut, a National Historic Landmark
Saint Andrew's Episcopal Church (1873) in Rochester, New York, on the NRHP
Fay Club (1883) in Fitchburg, Massachusetts, on the NRHP
Church of St. Joseph of Arimathea (1883) in Greenburgh, New York, on the NRHP
St. Mark's Episcopal Church (1886) in Augusta, Maine, on the NRHP
St. Margaret of Antioch Episcopal Church (1892) in Staatsburg, New York.
St. George's Protestant Episcopal Church (1887) in Brooklyn, New York, on the NRHP
St. Peter's Episcopal Church (1891) in Peekskill, New York, on the NRHP
Church of St. John in the Wilderness (1852) in Copake Falls, New York, on the NRHP

References

External links

Columbia University Libraries: The Upjohn collection of architectural drawings by Richard, Richard Michell, and Hobart Upjohn :Architectural drawings, papers, and records, (circa 1827-1910)

1828 births
1903 deaths
Burials at Green-Wood Cemetery
19th-century American architects
American ecclesiastical architects
British emigrants to the United States
Architects from New York City
Defunct architecture firms based in New York City
Fellows of the American Institute of Architects
 
People from Shaftesbury
Architects of Anglican churches
Architects of Presbyterian churches
Founder of American Institute of Architects